FC Kant is a Kyrgyzstani football club based in Kant that plays in the top division in Kyrgyzstan, the Kyrgyzstan League.

History 
2007: Founded as FC Kant-77.
2010: Renamed to FC Kant.
2010: Dissolved

Current squad

External links 
Career stats by KLISF

Football clubs in Kyrgyzstan
2007 establishments in Kyrgyzstan
Association football clubs established in 2007